The Church of St. Nicolas is a Roman Catholic church located in Saint-Maur-des-Fossés in the department of Val-de-Marne, France.

History

A chapel dedicated to St. Nicholas was mentioned in two abbey manuscripts in 1137 during the Miracle of Rain: after an intense drought that hit all Western Europe, the monks of Saint-Maur Abbey organised a procession of the relics of St. Maur to the boundary of the fiefdom, near Charenton. When they came back, a violent storm broke out while they were saying the Mass in the chapel of St. Nicholas.

The church was listed as a Class Historic Monument on February 3, 1947.

On January 7, 2018, the Mass celebrated in the Church of St. Nicholas on the day of Epiphany was broadcast live in France 2's Catholic programme Le Jour du Seigneur.

Pilgrimage

A Marian pilgrimage to Notre-Dame-des-Miracles took place at the church for nearly nine centuries until 1968. The pilgrimage resumed in 1988. According to the 1328 story of Regnault de Citry, a statue of the Virgin Mary was ordered by William de Corbeil and miraculously appeared in the workshop of a sculptor on July 10, 1068. According to the tradition, the statue is acheiropoieta (i.e. made without hands).

References

Roman Catholic churches in France
Churches in Val-de-Marne
Shrines to the Virgin Mary
Monuments historiques of Île-de-France